Gornji Kotorac is a part of the city of Istočno Sarajevo in Istočna Ilidža municipality, Republika Srpska, Bosnia and Herzegovina.

Istočno Sarajevo
Populated places in Istočna Ilidža